In mathematics, a multisection of a power series is a new power series composed of equally spaced terms extracted unaltered from the original series. Formally, if one is given a power series

 

then its multisection is a power series of the form

 

where p, q are integers, with 0 ≤ p < q. Series multisection represents one of the common transformations of generating functions.

Multisection of analytic functions 
A multisection of the series of an analytic function

 

has a closed-form expression in terms of the function :

 

where  is a primitive q-th root of unity. This expression is often called a root of unity filter. This solution was first discovered by Thomas Simpson.  This expression is especially useful in that it can convert an infinite sum into a finite sum.  It is used, for example, in a key step of a standard proof of Gauss's digamma theorem, which gives a closed-form solution to the digamma function evaluated at rational values p/q.

Examples

Bisection
In general, the bisections of a series are the even and odd parts of the series.

Geometric series
Consider the geometric series

 

By setting  in the above series, its multisections are easily seen to be

 

Remembering that the sum of the multisections must equal the original series, we recover the familiar identity

Exponential function
The exponential function

 

by means of the above formula for analytic functions separates into

 

The bisections are trivially the hyperbolic functions:

 
 

Higher order multisections are found by noting that all such series must be real-valued along the real line.  By taking the real part and using standard trigonometric identities, the formulas may be written in explicitly real form as

 

These can be seen as solutions to the linear differential equation  with boundary conditions , using Kronecker delta notation.  In particular, the trisections are

 
 
 

and the quadrisections are

Binomial series
Multisection of a binomial expansion

 

at x = 1 gives the following identity for the sum of binomial coefficients with step q:

References  

Somos, Michael A Multisection of q-Series, 2006.

Algebra
Combinatorics
Mathematical analysis
Complex analysis
Mathematical series